A total solar eclipse took place on November 23, 2003, with a magnitude of 1.0379. A solar eclipse occurs when the Moon passes between Earth and the Sun, thereby totally or partly obscuring the image of the Sun for a viewer on Earth. A total solar eclipse occurs when the Moon's apparent diameter is larger than the Sun's, blocking all direct sunlight, turning day into darkness. Totality occurs in a narrow path across Earth's surface, with the partial solar eclipse visible over a surrounding region thousands of kilometres wide.
It was visible from a corridor in the Antarctic region. A partial eclipse was seen from the much broader path of the Moon's penumbra, including the southern tip of South America and most of Australia.

For most solar eclipses the path of totality moves eastwards.  In this case the path moved south and then west round Antarctica.

Images 

Animated map

Related eclipses

Eclipse season 

This is the second eclipse this season.

First eclipse this season: 9 November 2003 Total Lunar Eclipse

Eclipses of 2003 

 A total lunar eclipse on May 16.
 An annular solar eclipse (one limit) on May 31.
 A total lunar eclipse on November 9.
 A total solar eclipse on November 23.

Tzolkinex 
 Preceded: Solar eclipse of October 12, 1996

 Followed: Solar eclipse of January 4, 2011

Half-Saros 
 Preceded: Lunar eclipse of November 18, 1994

 Followed: Lunar eclipse of November 28, 2012

Tritos 
 Preceded: Solar eclipse of December 24, 1992

 Followed: Solar eclipse of October 23, 2014

Solar Saros 152 
 Preceded: Solar eclipse of November 12, 1985

 Followed: Solar eclipse of December 4, 2021

Inex 
 Preceded: Solar eclipse of December 13, 1974

 Followed: Solar eclipse of November 3, 2032

Solar eclipses 2000–2003

Saros 152

Metonic series

Notes

References 
 Fred Espenak and Jay Anderson. "Total Solar Eclipse of 2003 November 23". NASA, July 2003.

 NASA graphics
 Google Map

Photos:
 Prof. Druckmüller's eclipse photography site. Flight over Antarctica
 Images from Antarctica by Crayford Manor House Astronomical Society
  APOD 8/5/2004, An Antarctic Total Solar Eclipse
  APOD 11/27/2003, The Long Shadow of the Moon, Total solar eclipse from satellite over Antarctica

2003 11 23
2003 in science
2003 11 23
November 2003 events